So Fresh: The Hits of Winter 2001 is a compilation of songs that were popular in Australia in winter 2001.

Track listing
 Nelly Furtado – "I'm Like a Bird" (4:03)
 Lil' Bow Wow – "Bow Wow (That's My Name)" (3:23)
 Limp Bizkit – "Rollin'" (3:35)
 Outkast – "Ms. Jackson" (4:03)
 Destiny's Child – "Survivor" (4:01)
 Jennifer Lopez – "Love Don't Cost a Thing" (3:42)
 Craig David – "7 Days" (3:56)
 3LW – "No More (Baby I'ma Do Right)" (3:31)
 ATC – "Around The World (La La La La La)" (3:36)
 Leah Haywood – "Takin' Back What's Mine" (3:40)
 Ronan Keating – "Lovin' Each Day" (3:32)
 Human Nature – "When We Were Young" (3:27)
 Nelly – "E.I." (4:15)
 Joy Enriquez – "Tell Me How You Feel" (4:06)
 Pink – "You Make Me Sick" (4:06)
 Bon Jovi – "Thank You For Loving Me" (5:09)
 soulDecision – "Ooh It's Kinda Crazy" (4:20)
 Tony Lee Scott – "Take Me Away" (3:05)
 K-Ci & JoJo – "Crazy" (4:21)
 Westlife – "I Lay My Love on You" (3:32)

Charts

References

External links 

 MusicBrainz page

So Fresh albums
2001 compilation albums
2001 in Australian music